Pakiso Mthembu (born 10 June 1999) is a South African long-distance runner.

In 2017, he competed in the junior men's race at the 2017 IAAF World Cross Country Championships held in Kampala, Uganda.

In 2019, he competed in the senior men's race at the 2019 IAAF World Cross Country Championships held in Aarhus, Denmark.<ref
name="senior_men_race_iaaf_world_cross_country_2019"></ref> He finished in 59th place and he was the second-best South African competitor in the race. He received the University of the Free State Sportsman of the Year 2019 award, joining the likes of Wayde van Niekerk .

References

External links 
 

Living people
1999 births
Place of birth missing (living people)
South African male long-distance runners
South African male cross country runners